Lakshay Garg (born 10 October 1995) is an Indian cricketer. He made his List A debut on 2 March 2014, for Goa in the 2013–14 Vijay Hazare Trophy. He made his first-class debut for Goa in the 2017–18 Ranji Trophy on 25 November 2017. The following month, in the match against Assam, he took his maiden five-wicket haul in first-class cricket. He was the leading wicket-taker for Goa in the 2018–19 Ranji Trophy, with 37 dismissals in eight matches.

References

External links
 

1995 births
Living people
Indian cricketers
Place of birth missing (living people)
Goa cricketers